To Be a Lady is a 1934 British romance drama, directed and produced by George King, and starring Chili Bouchier (credited here as Dorothy Bouchier) and Bruce Lester. The film is the first screen editing credit of American film editor Elmo Williams.

Plot
Diana Whitcombe (Bouchier) works at her aunt's country inn, but dreams of escaping to London and making her way in society. When chance provides her with the necessary funds, she makes her way to the big city and takes up employment in a hairdressing salon where she befriends French fellow assistant Annette (Ena Moon), and moves into the same hostel in which Annette is living.

One day Diana spots a kitten in danger on a busy road, and dashes into the traffic to rescue it. Her kind action is witnessed by singer Jerry Dean (Lester), who strikes up a conversation and invites her for lunch the next day at the Ritz Hotel. Diana is worried that has nothing suitable to wear to such a rarefied establishment, but is delighted when Annette produces a beautiful dress which she offers to loan to her. Unknown to Diana however, the dress has been stolen by a maid friend of Annette's from her wealthy employer, and passed to Annette for safe-keeping before it is sold to a dealer.

Diana and Jerry meet for their Ritz rendezvous. Unfortunately, also present is the Countess Delavell (Vera Bogetti) lunching with her theatrical friend Dudley Chalfont (Charles Cullum), and it is the Countess' stolen dress which Diana is wearing. At the end of the meeting Jerry, explaining that he has to leave to fulfil engagements in Scotland, proposes to Diana and she accepts. Meanwhile, the Countess' maid, aware that she is already under suspicion, steals some valuable jewellery, alerts Annette and the pair take off for France.

The Countess, believing Annette to be implicated in the thefts, visits the salon, identifies Diana as the girl who was wearing her dress, and Diana is arrested for receiving stolen property. She is found guilty and imprisoned for a month. She writes to Jerry at the address he has given her, but receives no acknowledgement. Jerry has in fact been seriously injured in a road accident en route to Scotland and is hospitalised for a lengthy period, but unaware of this, Diana believes he has abandoned her. On her release from prison, she decides to seek stage work and runs into Dudley. Dudley believes in her innocence and that she has been wronged, and offers her accommodation in his flat. He soon falls in love with her and asks her to marry him.

Jerry is finally released from hospital and returns to London to look for Diana. Finding her living in another man's flat, he confronts her over her fickleness and in anger at his lack of faith in her, she sends him away. She realises that her feelings are still for Jerry and it would be unfair of her to marry Dudley, so in despair she leaves London and returns to her home village. Aware of what the situation must be, the kind-hearted Dudley travels to the village with Jerry, where he engineers a reconciliation between the two.

Cast
 Chili Bouchier as Diana Whitcombe
 Bruce Lester as Jerry Dean
 Vera Bogetti as Countess Delavell
 Charles Cullum as Dudley Chalfont
 Ena Moon as Annette
 Pat Ronald as Justine
 Florence Vie as Mrs. Jubb
 Tony de Lungo as Manager

Production
To Be a Lady was mounted as a star vehicle for Bouchier, who at the time was one of Britain's biggest home-grown female screen stars, and one of the few who had been able to make the transition from silent to sound films without any loss in popularity. Indications are that the film was marketed as a prestige production, with advance publicity emphasising aspects such as "lavish mounting", "expert direction" and "faultless recording and camera work". It was reported that it had taken an entire day's filming for King to be satisfied with the kitten rescue sequence, which lasted a bare 60 seconds in the finished film.

Reception
Surviving contemporary critical reaction suggests that the film was less well-received that had been hoped.  The Picturegoer spoke of "moderate" acting, "unconvincing" plot and said "the wholly obvious theme is indifferently directed".  Kine Weekly was similarly unimpressed with the storyline, but somewhat more enthusiastic about the standards of acting and direction.

Preservation status
There is no record of To Be a Lady after its original 1934–1935 cinema run. The British Film Institute has been unable to locate a print for inclusion in the BFI National Archive, and currently classes the film as "missing, believed lost", and is included on the BFI's "75 Most Wanted" list of missing British feature films. It is the only sound film of Bouchier's not known to survive.

References

External links
 BFI 75 Most Wanted entry, with extensive notes
 
 

1934 films
1934 romantic drama films
British romantic drama films
British black-and-white films
Films directed by George King
Films set in London
Lost British films
British and Dominions Studios films
Films shot at Imperial Studios, Elstree
1934 lost films
Lost romantic drama films
1930s English-language films
1930s British films